"Flying on My Own" is a song by Canadian singer Celine Dion recorded for her twelfth English-language studio album, Courage (2019). It is an EDM and dance-pop track with elements of pop, adult contemporary, and electronic music. It was written by Jörgen Elofsson, Liz Rodrigues and Anton "Hybrid" Mårtensson, and produced by Elofsson, Hybrid and Ugly Babies. "Flying on My Own" (Live from Las Vegas) was released as a digital download on 9 June 2019, the day after Dion ended her 16-year Las Vegas residency, Celine. The studio version of "Flying on My Own" was released as the album's promotional single on 28 June 2019 by Columbia Records. The song received positive reviews from music critics. It reached number one in Quebec and top ten on the digital charts in Canada and France, and number seven on the US Dance Club Songs chart.

Background and release
On 19 December 2017, Dion shared a photo of her and Swedish songwriter and producer Jörgen Elofsson in the Studio at the Palms in Las Vegas and wrote "great fun, making beautiful music". Elofsson co-wrote hits for many artists, including Kelly Clarkson, Britney Spears and Westlife. On 7 June 2019, Dion premiered a new song, "Flying on My Own" during her Las Vegas residency show, Celine. Before performing it, she said "I have been waiting for a long, long time for… It's my brand new song. I have to admit that my knees are shaking right now, I'm very nervous". The EDM song was written by Elofsson, Liz Rodrigues and Anton "Hybrid" Mårtensson, and produced by Elofsson, Hybrid and Ugly Babies. The performance in Las Vegas was filmed and uploaded to Dion's YouTube channel the next day. On 8 June 2019, Dion also concluded her 16-year residency at Caesars Palace in Las Vegas. The digital download of "Flying on My Own" (Live from Las Vegas) was released on 9 June 2019. The studio version of the song was released digitally on 28 June 2019, along with the Dave Audé remix, and was included on Dion's album, Courage, released in November 2019. According to Sony Music, the song is more of a gift to fans than an official single from the album. "Flying on My Own" was not sent to radio stations, but it was launched on Spotify, Apple Music and all other streaming platforms. Dion performed "Flying on My Own" during her BST Hyde Park concert in London on 5 July 2019. On 12 August 2019, DJ Riddler premiered his official remix of "Flying on My Own".

Critical reception
"Flying on My Own" received positive critical reviews. Mike Wass from Idolator described it as a soaring dance-pop anthem, an incessantly upbeat, campy banger. Furthermore, it suggests that Dion's upcoming album, Courage, is going to be full of surprises. According to Hilary Hughes from Billboard, with "Flying on My Own", Dion has "written" her own Sin City nightclub anthem. Hughes added that the impact Vegas' nightlife has had on Dion's music is felt in every undulating rhythm and groove in the song. CBC Music also praised it writing that Dion soars on this dance anthem as she embraces the "winds of change" as she sings. According to CBC review, it is the beat drop of the chorus paired with Dion's "tremendous emphasis" of the words "my own" that make this track "truly take off".

Commercial performance
"Flying on My Own" topped the chart in Quebec and reached number nine on the sales chart in Canada. In the United States, it peaked at number seven on the Dance Club Songs chart and number 23 on Pop Digital Song Sales. In France, the song reached number eight on the digital sales chart. "Flying on My Own" also peaked at number 90 in Scotland and number 99 on the UK Singles Downloads Chart.

Music video
The debut live performance of "Flying on My Own" was filmed in Las Vegas on 7 June 2019 and uploaded to Dion's YouTube channel the next day. The lyric video was released on YouTube on 28 June 2019, along with the audio of a remix by Dave Audé.

Track listing
Digital single
"Flying on My Own" – 3:32
"Flying on My Own" (Dave Audé Remix) – 4:06

Digital single
"Flying on My Own" (Live from Las Vegas) – 3:58

Remixes
"Flying on My Own" (Dave Audé Club Remix) – 6:29
"Flying on My Own" (Dave Audé Mixshow) – 4:51
"Flying on My Own" (Dave Audé Remix) – 4:06
"Flying on My Own" (Riddler Club Remix) – 5:04
"Flying on My Own" (Riddler Radio Mix) – 3:22
"Flying on My Own" (Riddler Dub Remix) – 3:39
"Flying on My Own" (Riddler Instrumental Club Remix) – 5:02
"Flying on My Own" (Riddler Instrumental Radio Mix) – 3:21

Source:

Credits and personnel

Jörgen Elofsson – composer, lyricist, producer, keyboards
Liz Rodrigues – composer, lyricist, background vocal
Anton "Hybrid" Mårtensson – composer, producer, keyboards
Ugly Babies – producer
Paw Lagermann – keyboards, mixing engineer
Lina Rafn – keyboards
Vlado Meller – mastering engineer
François Lalonde – recording engineer
Rob Katz – assistant engineer
John McL. Doelp – executive producer

Source:

Charts

Release history

References

External links

2019 singles
2019 songs
Celine Dion songs
Columbia Records singles
Dance-pop songs
Electronic dance music songs
House music songs
Songs written by Jörgen Elofsson